The Aymestrey burial was a beaker cist at Aymestrey, Herefordshire, England. The remains and objects are now in a recreated cist, at Leominster Museum.

Discovery 
While working a gravel quarry at Aymestrey, in June 1987, employees of ARC unearthed a hole with a stone lining, and human remains visible within. They called in archaeologists from Hereford and Worcester County Council, who carried out an excavation and discovered a stone-lined burial pit containing the body of a child, lying on its left-hand side in a foetal position. Alongside the body were an earthenware bell beaker and a flint knife. The burial was dated to the Early Bronze Age.

Site 
The site lies between the Iron Age hill forts at Pyon Wood and Croft Ambrey, and alongside a tributary of the River Lugg. A similar beaker burial site was also discovered in 1987 in Achavanich, Caithness, Scotland.

Recreation 
The burial has been recreated as a display at Leominster Museum (pictured).

References 

 Woodiwiss, S.. 1989. Salvage Excavation of a Beaker Burial from Aymestrey. Transactions of the Woolhope Naturalists' Field Club. XLVI 1989 Part II. 169-176. XLVI 1989 Part II. Page(s) 169.
  Excavation of a beaker burial from Aymestrey (HWCM 7060), Simon Woodiwiss, with contributions from Richard Harrison, Frances Lee, Alan Saville, illustrations by Carolyn Hunt. Published 1988 by Hereford and Worcester County Council Archaeology Section

Burials in Herefordshire
1987 in England
Leominster
Bronze Age sites in Herefordshire